Alquines is a commune in the Pas-de-Calais department in northern France.

Geography
A town located 18 miles (29 km) east of Boulogne-sur-Mer, at the junction of the D216 with the D191 road, by the banks of the river Hem.

Population

Sights
 The sixteenth century church.
 Remains of a feudal motte.
 The Chapel de Fromentel.
 The war memorial.

See also
Communes of the Pas-de-Calais department

References

External links

 Alquines war memorial 

Communes of Pas-de-Calais